Witit Witit is the fourteenth studio album by producer and rapper Daz. It was released on December 4, 2012, through Dogg Pound Records.

Track listing

References

2012 albums
Daz Dillinger albums
D.P.G. Recordz albums
Albums produced by Daz Dillinger
Albums produced by Mike Will Made It
Albums produced by Drumma Boy